is a passenger railway station located in the Nishi-Ikuta neighborhood of Tama-ku, Kawasaki, Kanagawa, Japan and operated by the private railway operator Odakyu Electric Railway.

Lines

Station layout
The station consists of two opposed side platforms serving two tracks.

Platforms

History
It became a local stop in 1945, and was promoted to a “Semi-Express” stop in 1946, a “Sakura Semi-Express” stop in 1948, and  “Commuter Special Express” stop in 1960. It was renamed to its present name in 1964. A new station concourse was completed in 1995.

Station numbering was introduced in January 2014 with Yomiuriland-mae being assigned station number OH21.

Passenger statistics
In fiscal 2019, the station was used by an average of 36,082 passengers daily.

The passenger figures for previous years are as shown below.

Surrounding area
Yomiuriland, home to one of the Yomiuri Giants baseball team's training grounds, as well as a large amusement park is nearby the station.  Japan Women's University's Nishi-Ikuta Campus is also located here.

See also
 List of railway stations in Japan

References

External links

  

Railway stations in Kanagawa Prefecture
Railway stations in Japan opened in 1927
Odakyu Odawara Line
Railway stations in Kawasaki, Kanagawa